Broadcast Exchange Format (BXF) is an SMPTE standard for data exchange in the broadcasting industry.

History
BXF was developed to replace various archaic types of exchange for playlists, record lists and other data in broadcasting. Version 1.0 (SMPTE standard 2021) was published in 2008. Over 150 SMPTE members have been involved in defining the standard. BXF is XML based.

See also 
 AAF, Advanced Authoring Format
 BWF, broadcast Wave Format
 MXF, Material eXchange Format

References

External links 
 SMPTE standards

Standards of the United States
Computer file formats
Film and video technology